The Taiwan Stock Exchange Corporation (TWSE) is a financial institution, located in Taipei 101, in Taipei, Taiwan. The TWSE was established in 1961 and began operating as a stock exchange on 9 February 1962. It is regulated by the Financial Supervisory Commission.

As of 31 December 2013, the Taiwan Stock Exchange had 809 listed companies with a combined market capitalization of NT$ 24,519,622 million.

The exchange broadcasts before-hour information from 7:40 to 8:40. Then it has normal trading sessions from 09:00 to 13:45 and fixed price post-market sessions from 14:00 to 15:00 on all days of the week except Saturdays, Sundays and holidays declared by the exchange in advance.

Leadership

The current chairman of the TWSE is Hsu Jan-yau. The President is Lee Chi-hsien.

Indices
The Taiwan Capitalization Weighted Stock Index (TAIEX) is the stock market index that measures the aggregate performance of listed stocks on TWSE; it is the most prominent and most frequently quoted index of stock performance of Taiwanese public companies.

See also
 Taiwan Capitalization Weighted Stock Index
 List of companies in Taiwan
 List of Asian stock exchanges
 List of stock exchanges

References

External links

 

Financial services companies established in 1961
1961 establishments in Taiwan
Economy of Taiwan
Stock exchanges in Asia

Finance in Taiwan